Diego Viera (born April 10, 1972 in Montevideo, Uruguay) is a Uruguayan  football (soccer) forward who played professionally in Uruguay and Major League Soccer.

Viera began playing for C.A. Cerro in the Primera Division Uruguaya in 1990.  On February 7, 1996, the Tampa Bay Mutiny selected Viera in the fifth round (forty-seventh overall) of the 1996 MLS Inaugural Player Draft.  In 1998, he signed with the Florida ThunderCats in the National Professional Soccer League.

References

Living people
1972 births
C.A. Cerro players
Florida ThunderCats players
Major League Soccer players
National Professional Soccer League (1984–2001) players
Tampa Bay Mutiny players
Tampa Bay Cyclones players
Uruguayan footballers
Uruguayan expatriate footballers
Association football forwards